Kerch (Керчь) was a  missile cruiser of the Soviet and later Russian Navy. It served as part of the Black Sea Fleet. The ship was scrapped in 2020 following a large fire which broke out on 4 November 2014.

History 
Kerch was laid down in the Soviet Union on 30 April 1971, launched on 21 July 1972 and was commissioned in the Soviet Black Sea Fleet on 25 December 1974. The ship was constructed in the 61 Kommunar Shipyard at Nikolayev (Mykolaiv) on the Black Sea. She was in service with the Soviet Fleet until 1991, and then joined its successor, Russian Navy.

On 4 November 2014 a fire broke out aboard the ship during a routine servicing in Sevastopol. According to officials nobody was injured and the fire was contained to the ship's aft. On April 24th 2020 the ship was towed away from its dock for the scrapyard. Satellite images published in Google Earth show several stages of the ship's demolition in Inkerman between May and the end of 2020.

References 

Kara-class cruisers
Ships built in the Soviet Union
Ships built at Shipyard named after 61 Communards
1972 ships
Maritime incidents in 2014
Cold War cruisers of the Soviet Union
Ships involved in the Russo-Ukrainian War